This is a list of state leaders in the 12th century (1101–1200) AD, except for the many leaders within the Holy Roman Empire.

Africa

Africa: Central

Chad

Kanem Empire (Kanem–Bornu) (complete list) –
Dunama I, Mai (1080–1133)
Bir I, Mai (1133–1160)
Abdallah I, Mai (1160–1176)
Salmama I, Mai (1176–1203)

Africa: East

Ethiopia

Zagwe dynasty of Ethiopia (complete list) –
Kedus Harbe, Negus (c.1079–c.1119)
Gebre Mesqel Lalibela, Negus (1189–1229)

Somalia

Sultanate of Ifat: Walashma dynasty (complete list) –
ʿUmar DunyaHuz, Sultan (1185–1228)

Africa: Northeast

Egypt

Fatimid Caliphate (complete list) –
al-Musta'li, Caliph (1094–1101)
al-Amir bi-Ahkami'l-Lah, Caliph (1101–1130)
al-Hafiz, Caliph (1130–1149)
al-Zafir, Caliph (1149–1154)
al-Fa'iz bi-Nasr Allah, Caliph (1154–1160)
al-Adid, Caliph (1160–1171)

Sudan

Makuria (complete list) –
Georgios IV, King (1130–1158)
Moses Georgios, King (c.1158)

Africa: Northcentral

Ifriqiya

Zirid dynasty (complete list) –
Tamim ibn al-Mu'izz, ruler (1062–1108) 
Yahya ibn Tamim, ruler (1108–1131)
Ali ibn Yahya, ruler (1115–1121)
Abul-Hasan al-Hasan ibn Ali, ruler (1121–1152)

Africa: Northwest

Morocco

Almoravid dynasty of Morocco (complete list) –
Yusuf ibn Tashfin, Sultan (1072–1106)
Ali ibn Yusuf, Sultan (1106–1142)
Tashfin ibn Ali, Sultan (1142–1146)
Ibrahim ibn Tashfin, Sultan (1146)
Ishaq ibn Ali, Sultan (1146–1147)

Almohad Caliphate of Morocco (complete list) –
Abd al-Mu'min, Caliph (1147–1163)
Abu Yaqub Yusuf, Caliph (1163–1184)
Yaqub al-Mansur, Caliph (1184–1199)
Muhammad al-Nasir, Caliph (1199–1213)

Africa: West

Benin

Kingdom of Benin (complete list) –
Eweka I, Oba (1180–1246)

Nigeria

Kingdom of Kano (complete list) –
Gijimasu dan Warisi, King (1095–1134)
Nawata, King (1134–1136)
Yusa, King (1136–1194)
Naguji, King (1194–1247)

Kingdom of Nri (complete list) –
Eze Nri Nàmóke, King (1090–1158)
Eze Nri Buífè, King (1159–1259)

Asia

Asia: Central

Afghanistan

Ghaznavid dynasty (complete list) –
Mas'ud III, Sultan (1099–1115)
Shir-Zad, Sultan (1115–1116)
Arslan-Shah, Sultan (1116–1117)
Bahram-Shah, Sultan (1117–1157)
Khusrau Shah, Sultan (1157–1160)
Khusrau Malik, Sultan (1160–1186)

Kazakhstan

Qara Khitai / Western Liao
Yelü Dashi, Emperor (1124–1143)
Xiao Tabuyan, Empress Regent (1144–1150)
Renzong, Emperor (1150–1164)
Yelü Pusuwan, Empress Regent (1164–1178)
Yelü Zhilugu, Sovereign (1178–1211)

Mongolia

Khamag Mongol (complete list) –
Khaidu, ruler (?–c.1100)
Khabul, Khan (1120–1148)
Ambaghai, Khan (1148–1156)
Hotula, Khan (1156–1160)
Yesugei de facto ruler (?–1171)
Genghis, Khan (1189–1206)

Tibet

Guge
Zhi ba 'Od, ruler (?–1111)
bSod nams rtse, King (c.1095–early 12th century)
bKra shis rtse, King (pre-1137)
Jo bo rGyal po, Regent (mid-12th century)
rTse 'bar btsan, King (12th century)
sPyi lde btsan, King (12th century)
rNam lde btsan, King (12th/13th century)
Nyi ma lde, King (12th/13th century)

Asia: East

Khitan China: Liao dynasty

Liao dynasty (complete list) –
Daozong, Emperor (1055–1101) 
Tianzuo, Emperor (1101–1125)

China: Northern Song

Song dynasty (complete list) –
Huizong, Emperor (1100–1125) 
Qinzong, Emperor (1126–1127)

China: Jin dynasty

Jin dynasty –
Taizu, Emperor (1115–1123)
Taizong, Emperor (1123–1135)
Xizong, Emperor (1135–1150)
Prince of Hailing, Emperor (1150–1161)
Shizong, Emperor (1161–1189)
Zhangzong, Emperor (1189–1208)

China: Other states and entities

Dali Kingdom (complete list) –
Duan Zhengchun, Emperor (1096–1108)
Duan Yu, Emperor (1108–1147)
Duan Zhengxing, Emperor (1147–1171)
Duan Zhixing, Emperor (1171–1200)
Duan Zhilian, Emperor (1200–1204)

Western Xia –
Chóngzōng, Emperor (1086–1139)
Rénzōng, Emperor (1139–1193)
Huánzōng, Emperor (1193–1206)

China: Southern Song

Song dynasty (complete list) –
Gaozong, Emperor (1127–1162) 
Xiaozong, Emperor (1162–1189) 
Guangzong, Emperor (1189–1194) 
Ningzong, Emperor (1194–1224)

Japan

Heian period Japan (complete list) –
Horikawa, Emperor (1087–1107)
Toba, Emperor (1107–1123)
Sutoku, Emperor (1123–1142)
Konoe, Emperor (1142–1155)
Go-Shirakawa, Emperor (1155–1158)
Nijō, Emperor (1158–1165)
Rokujō, Emperor (1165–1168)
Takakura, Emperor (1168–1180)
Antoku, Emperor (1180–1185)
Go-Toba, Emperor (1183–1198)

Kamakura shogunate
Emperors (complete list) –
Go-Toba, Emperor (1183–1198)
Tsuchimikado, Emperor (1198–1210)
Shōgun (complete list) –
Minamoto no Yoritomo, shōgun (1192–1199)

Ryukyu Kingdom: Shunten Dynasty –
Shunten, Chief (1187–1237)

Korea

Goryeo (complete list) –
Sukjong, King (1095–1105)
Yejong, King (1105–1122)
Injong, King (1122–1146)
Uijong, King (1146–1170)
Myeongjong, King (1170–1197)
Sinjong, King (1197–1204)

Asia: Southeast

Cambodia
Khmer Empire (complete list) –
Nripatindravarman, King (1080–1113)
Jayavarman VI, King (1080–1107)
Dharanindravarman I, King (1107–1113)
Suryavarman II, King (1113–1150)
Dharanindravarman II, King (1150–1156)
Yasovarman II, King (1156–1165)
Tribhuvanadityavarman, King (1165–1177)
Jayavarman VII, King (1181–1218)

Indonesia

Indonesia: Java

Sunda Kingdom (complete list) –
Prabu Langlangbhumi, Maharaja (1064–1154)
Rakeyan Jayagiri, Maharaja (1154–1156)
Prabu Dharmakusumah, Maharaja (1156–1175)
Prabu Guru Dharmasiksa, Maharaja (1175-1297)

Kediri Kingdom –
Jayawarsa, King (c.1104–1115)
Kameshwara, King (c.1115–1130)
Jayabaya, King (c.1130–1157)
Sarweshwara, King (c.1160–1170)
Aryyeçwara, King (c.1170–1180)
Gandra, King (c.1180–1190)
Çrngga, King (c.1190–1200)
Kertajaya, King (1200–1222)

Indonesia: Sumatra

Srivijaya: Palembang –
Rajaraja Chola II, King (c.1156)
Srimat Trailokyaraja Maulibhusana Warmadewa, King (c.1183)

Melayu Kingdom/ Dharmasraya: Mauli dynasty (complete list) –
Trailokyaraja, King (c.1183)

Indonesia: Lesser Sunda Islands
Bali Kingdom (complete list) –
Warmadewa dynasty
Śri Maharaja Sakalendukirana Laksmidhara Wijayottunggadewi, Queen (fl.1088–1101)
Śri Suradhipa, King (fl.1115–1119)
Jaya dynasty
Śri Jayaśakti, King (fl.1133–1150)
Ragajaya, King (fl.1155)
Jayapangus, King (fl.1178–1181)
Arjayadengjayaketana, Queen (fl.1200)
Haji Ekajayalancana, King (co-regent fl.1200)

Malaysia: Peninsular
Kedah Sultanate (complete list) –
Durbar II, Raja (c.956–1136)
Mudzaffar Shah I, Sultan, (1136–1179)
Mu'adzam Shah, Sultan, (1179–1202)

Myanmar / Burma
Pagan Kingdom (complete list) –
Alaungsithu (Sithu I), King (1112/13–1167)
Narathu, King (1167–1171)
Naratheinkha, King (1171–1174)
Narapatisithu (Sithu II), King (1174–1211)

Philippines
Tondo (complete list) –
Lakan Timamanukum, ruler (12th century)

Thailand
Ngoenyang (complete list) –
Lao Chong, King (11th–12th century)
Chom Pha Rueang, King (early 12th century–1148)
Chueang, King (1148–1192)
Lao Ngoen Rueang, King (1192–early 13th century)

Vietnam

Champa (complete list) –
Jaya Indravarman II, King (1080–1081, 1086–1114)
Harivarman V, King (1114–1139)
Jaya Indravarman III, King (1139/45)
Rudravarman IV, (Khmer vassal) King (1145–1147)
Jaya Harivarman I, King (1147–1167)
Jaya Harivarman II, King (1167)
Jaya Indravarman IV, King (1167–1190)
Suryajayavarmadeva, (Khmer vassal in Vijaya) King (1190–1191)
Vidyanandana, (Khmer vassal in Pandurang) King (1190–1203)

Đại Việt: Later Lý dynasty (complete list) –
Lý Nhân Tông, Emperor (1072–1127)
Lý Thần Tông, Emperor (1128–1138)
Lý Anh Tông, Emperor (1138–1175)
Lý Cao Tông, Emperor (1176–1210)

Asia: South

Afghanistan

Ghaznavids (complete list) –
Masʽud III, Sultan (1099–1115)
Shir-Zad, Sultan (1115–1116)
Arslan-Shah, Sultan (1116–1117)
Bahram-Shah, Sultan (1117–1157)
Khusrau-Shah, Sultan (1157–1160)
Khusrau Malik, Sultan (1160–1186)
Khosrow-Shah, Sultan (1168–1176)

Ghurid dynasty (complete list) –
Izz al-Din Husayn, Malik (1100–1146)
Sayf al-Din Suri, Malik (1146–1149)
Baha al-Din Sam I, Malik (1149)
Ala al-Din Husayn, Malik (1149–1161)
Sayf al-Din Muhammad, Malik (1161–1163)
Ghiyath al-Din Muhammad, Malik (1163–1203)
Muhammad of Ghor, Malik (1172–1206)

Bengal and Northeast India

Chutia Kingdom (complete list) –
Birpal, King (1187–1224)

Mallabhum (complete list) –
Prakash Malla, King (1097–1102)
Ram Malla, King (1185–1209)

Kingdom of Manipur (complete list) –
Loiyumba, King (1074–1112)
Loitongpa, King (1112–1150)
Atom Yoilempa, King (1150–1163)
Iyanthapa, King (1163–1195)
Thayanthapa, King (1195–1231)

Pala Empire (complete list) –
Ramapala, King (1072–1126)
Kumarapala, King (1126–1128)
Gopala III, King (1128–1143)
Madanapala, King (1143–1161)
Govindapala, King (1161–1165)

Sena dynasty (complete list) –
Vijaya Sena, King (1096–1159)
Ballala Sena, King (1159–1179)
Lakshmana Sena, King (1179–1206)

India

Amber Kingdom (complete list) –
Malayasi, King (1094–1146)
Vijaldeo, King (1146–1179)
Rajdeo, King (1179–1216)

Chahamanas of Naddula (complete list) –
Jojalladeva, King (c.1090–1110)
Asharaja, King (c.1110–1119)
Ratnapala, King (c.1119–1132)
Rayapala, King (c.1132–1145)
Katukaraja, King (c.1145–1148)
Alhanadeva, King (c.1148–1163)
Kelhanadeva, King (c.1163–1193)
Jayatasimha, King (c.1193–1197)

Chahamanas of Shakambhari (complete list) –
Ajayaraja II, King (c.1110–1135)
Arnoraja, King (c.1135–1150)
Jagaddeva, King (c.1150)
Vigraharaja IV, King (c.1150–1164)
Aparagangeya, King (c.1164–1165)
Prithviraja II, King (c.1165–1169)
Someshvara, King (c.1169–1178)
Prithviraj Chauhan, King (c.1178–1192)
Govindaraja IV, King (c.1192)
Hariraja, King (c.1193–1194)

Chandelas of Jejakabhukti (complete list) –
Sallakshana-Varman, King (c.1100–1110)
Jaya-Varman, King (c.1110–1120)
Prithvi-Varman, King (c.1120–1128)
Madana-Varman, King (c.1128–1165)
Yasho-Varman II, King (c.1164–1165)
Paramardi-Deva, King (c.1165–1203)

Chaulukya dynasty of Gujarat (complete list) –
Jayasimha Siddharaja, King (1094–1143)
Kumarapala, King (1143–1172) 
Ajayapala, King (1172–1174) 
Mularaja II, King (1174–1177) 
Bhima II, King (1177–1240)

Western Chalukya Empire (complete list) –
Vikramaditya VI, King (1076–1126)
Someshvara III, King (1126–1138)
Jagadhekamalla II1138–1151)
Tailapa III, King (1151–1164)
Jagadhekamalla III, King (1163–1183)
Someshvara IV, King (1184–1200)

Chera/Perumals of Makotai (complete list) –
Rama Varma Kulashekhara, King (1089–1102/22)
Kotha Varma Marthandam, King (1102–1125)
Vira Kerala Varma I, King (1125–1145)
Kodai Kerala Varma, King (1145–1150)
Vira Ravi Varma, King (1145–1150)
Vira Kerala Varma II, King (1164–1167)
Vira Aditya Varma, King (1167–1173)
Vira Udaya Martanda Varma, King (1173–1192)
Devadaram Vira Kerala Varma III, King (1192–1195)
Vira Manikantha Rama Varma Tiruvadi, King (1195–?)

Chola dynasty (complete list) –
Kulothunga Chola I, King (1070–1120)
Vikrama Chola, King (1118–1135)
Kulothunga Chola II, King (1133–1150)
Rajaraja Chola II, King (1146–1173)
Rajadhiraja Chola II, King (1166–1178)
Kulothunga Chola III, King (1178–1218)

Gahadavala dynasty (complete list) –
Chandradeva, King (c.1089–1103)
Madanapala, King (c.1104–1113)
Govindachandra, King (c.1114–1155)
Vijayachandra, King (c.1155–1169)
Jayachandra, King (c.1170–1194)
Harishchandra, King (c.1194–1197)

Eastern Ganga dynasty (complete list) –
Anantavarman Chodaganga, King (1078–1150)
Jateswara Deva or Ekajata Deva, King (1147–1156)
Raghava Deva, King (1156–1170)
Rajaraja Deva II, King (1170–1178)
Ananga Bhima Deva II, King (1178–1198)
Rajaraja Deva III, King (1198–1211)

Garhwal Kingdom (complete list) –
Vibhog Pal, King (1084–1101)
Suvayanu Pal, King (1102–1115)
Vikram Pal, King (1116–1131)
Vichitra Pal, King (1131–1140)
Hans Pal, King (1141–1152)
Som Pal, King (1152–1159)
Kadil Pal, King (1159–1164)
Kamdev Pal, King (1172–1179)
Sulakshan Dev, King (1179–1197)
Lakhan Dev, King (1197–1220)

Hoysala Empire (complete list) –
Ereyanga, King (1098–1102)
Veera Ballala I, King (1102–1108)
Vishnuvardhana, King (1108–1152)
Narasimha I, King (1152–1173)
Veera Ballala II, King (1173–1220)

Jaisalmer (complete list) –
Rawal Jaisal, Rawal (1153–1168)
Shalivahan Singh II, Rawal (1168–1200)
Baijal Singh, Rawal (1200)
Kailan Singh, Rawal (1200–1219)

Kahlur (complete list) –
Gokul Chand, Raja (early 12th century)
Udai Chand, Raja (1133–1143)
Gen Chand, Raja (late 12th century)
Pruthvi Chand, Raja (late 12th century)
Sangar Chand, Raja (1197–1220)

Kakatiya dynasty (complete list) –
Rudra, King (c.1158–1195)
Mahadeva, King (c.1196–1199)
Ganapati-deva, King (c.1199–1262)

Kalachuris of Kalyani (complete list) –
Bijjala II, King (1162–1167)
Sovideva, King (1168–1176)
Mallugi, King (c.1176)
Sankama, King (1176–1180)
Ahavamalla, King (1180–1183)
Singhana, King (1183–1184)

Kalachuris of Tripuri (complete list) –
Yashahkarna, King (1073–1123)
Gayakarna, King (1123–1153)
Narasimha, King (1153–1163)
Jayasimha, King (1163–1188)
Vijayasimha, King (1188–1210)

Kumaon Kingdom: Chand (complete list) –
Laxmi Chand, King (1093–1113)
Dharm Chand, King (1113–1121)
Karm Chand, King (1121–1140)
Ballal Chand, King (1140–1149)
Nami Chand, King (1149–1170)
Nar Chand, King (1170–1177)
Nanaki Chand, King (1177–1195)
Ram Chand, King (1195–1205)

Kingdom of Kutch (complete list) –
Lakho Jadani, King (1147–?)
Ratto Rayadhan, King (1175–?)

Lohara dynasty (complete list) –
Harsha, King (1089–1101)

Pandyan dynasty (complete list) –
Seervallabha Manakulachala, King (1101–1124)
Maaravaramban Seervallaban, King (1132–1161)
Parakrama Pandyan I, King (1161–1162)
Jatavarman Srivallaban, King (1175–1180)
Sadayavarman Kulasekaran I, King (1190–1216)

Paramaras of Chandravati (complete list) –
Kakkala-deva, or Kakala-deva, King (c.1090–1115)
Vikrama-simha, King (c.1115–1145)
Yasho-dhavala, King (c.1145–1160)
Rana-simha, King (?)
Dhara-varsha, King (c.1160–1220)

Paramara dynasty of Malwa (complete list) –
Naravarman, King (1094–1130)
Yashovarman, King (1133–1142)
Jayavarman I, King (1142–1143)
Vindhyavarman, King (1175–1194)
Subhatavarman, King (1194–1209)

Seuna (Yadava) dynasty (complete list) –
Bhillama V, King (c.1187–1191)
Jaitugi I, King (c.1191–1200/10)

Sisodia (complete list) –
Samanta Singh, Rajput (1172–1179)
Khumar, Manthan, Padam Singh, Rajput (1179–1213)

Maldives

Sultanate of the Maldives: Theemuge dynasty (complete list) –
Koimala, King (1117–1141)
Dhovemi, King/Sultan (1141–1166/1176)
Muthey, Sultan (1166/1176–1185)
Ali I, Sultan (1185–1193)
Dhinei, Sultan (1193–1199)
Dhihei, Sultan (1199–1214)

Nepal

Khasa kingdom
Naga lde, King (early 12th century)
bTsan phyug lde, King (mid-12th century)
bKra shis lde, King (12th century)
Grags btsan lde, King (12th century)

Pakistan

Soomra dynasty –
Zainab Tari, Queen (1092–1102)
Dodo Bin Khafef Soomro III, King (1181–1195)

Sri Lanka

Kingdom of Polonnaruwa (complete list) –
Vijayabahu I, King (1056–1111)
Jayabahu I, King (1110–1111)
Vikramabahu I, King (1111–1132)
Gajabahu II, King (1131–1153)
Parakramabahu I, King (1153–1186)
Vijayabahu II, King (1186–1187)
Mahinda VI, King (1187–1187)
Nissanka Malla, King (1187–1196)
Vira Bahu I, King (1196–1196)
Vikramabahu II, King (1196–1196)
Chodaganga, King (1196–1197)
Lilavati, King (1197–1200, 1209–1210, 1211–1212)

Asia: West

Mesopotamia

Abbasid Caliphate, Baghdad (complete list) –
al-Mustazhir, Caliph (1094–1118)
ar-Rashid, Caliph (1109–1138)
al-Muqtafi, Caliph (1136–1160)
al-Mustanjid, Caliph (1160–1170)
al-Mustadi, Caliph (1170–1180)
al-Nasir, Caliph (1180–1225)

Yemen

Yemeni Zaidi State (complete list) –
al-Mutawakkil Ahmad bin Sulayman, Imam (1138–1171)
al-Mansur Abdallah, Imam (1187–1217)

Europe

Europe: Balkans

Second Bulgarian Empire (complete list) –
Peter IV, Emperor (1185–1190, 1196–1197)
Ivan Asen I, Emperor (1189–1196)
Kaloyan, Emperor (1197–1207)

Byzantine Empire (complete list) –
Alexios I Komnenos, Emperor (1081–1118)
John II Komnenos, Emperor (1092–1143) with Alexios Komnenos, Emperor (1048–1118) as co-emperor
Manuel I Komnenos, Emperor (1118–1180)
Alexios II Komnenos, Emperor (1180–1183)
Andronikos I Komnenos, Emperor (1183–1185)
Isaac II Angelos, Emperor (1185–1195)
Alexios III Angelos, Emperor (1195–1203)

Duklja (complete list) –
Constantine Bodin, King (1081–1101)
Mihailo II, King (1101–1102)
Dobroslav II, King (1101–1102)
Kočopar, Prince (1102–1103)
Vladimir, King (1103–1113)
Đorđe Bodinović, King (1113–1118, 1125–1131)
Grubeša, vassal Prince (1118–1125)
Gradinja, vassal ruler (1131–1148)
Radoslav, vassal Prince (c.1146–c.1148/1162)
Mihailo III, Prince (1165/75–1186/89)

Grand Principality of Serbia (complete list) –
Vukan, Grand Prince (1091–1112)
Uroš I, Grand Prince (1112–1145)
Uroš II, Grand Prince (1145–1161)
Desa, Grand Prince (1149–1155, 1162–1166)
Beloš, Grand Prince (1162)
Tihomir, Grand Prince (1166)
Stefan Nemanja, Grand Prince (1166–1196)
Stefan the First-Crowned, Grand Prince (1196–1202, 1204–1217), King (1217–1228)

Europe: British Isles

Great Britain: Scotland

Kingdom of Scotland/ Kingdom of Alba (complete list) –
Edgar, King (1097–1107)
Alexander I, King (1107–1124)
David I, King (1124–1153)
Malcolm IV, King (1153–1165)
William I the Lion, King (1165–1214)

Kingdom of Strathclyde (complete list) –
Máel Coluim II, King (c.1054)
David, Prince of the Cumbrians (1113–1124), King of the Scots (1124–1153)

Kingdom of the Isles (complete list) –
Magnus Barefoot, King (1098–1102)
Sigurd the Crusader, King (1102–1103)
Lǫgmaðr Guðrøðarson, King (c.1100)
Domnall mac Taidc, King (1111–c.1115)
Óláfr Guðrøðarson (died 1153), King (1112/1115–1153)
Somerled), King (1158–1164)

Kingdom of the Isles: Mann and the North Isles (complete list) –
Rǫgnvaldr Óláfsson, King (fl.1164)
Guðrøðr Óláfsson, King (1153/1154–1156, 1164–1187)
Rǫgnvaldr Guðrøðarson, King (1187–1226)

Kingdom of the Isles: The South Isles (complete list) –
Dubgall mac Somairle, King (?–c.1175)
Ragnall mac Somairle, King (1164–1207)

Great Britain: England

Kingdom of England (complete list) –
Henry I, King (1100–1135)
Stephen, King (1135–1154)
Matilda, Queen claimant (1141–1148)
Henry II, King (1154–1189)
Henry the Young King, junior King (1170–1183)
Richard I, King (1189–1199)
John, King of England (1199–1216), Lord of Ireland (1177–1216)

Great Britain: Wales

Kingdom of Gwynedd (complete list) –
Gruffydd ap Cynan, King (1081–1137)
Owain Gwynedd, King (1137–1170)
Hywel ab Owain Gwynedd, King (1170)

Kingdom of Powys (complete list) –
Iorwerth ap Bleddyn, Prince (1075–1103)
Cadwgan ap Bleddyn, Prince (1075–1111)
Owain ap Cadwgan, Prince (1111–1116)
Maredudd ap Bleddyn, Prince (1116–1132)
Madog ap Maredudd, Prince (1132–1160)

Deheubarth (complete list) –
Gruffydd ap Rhys, ruler (1116–1137)
Anarawd ap Gruffydd, ruler (1136–1143)
Cadell ap Gruffydd, ruler (1143–1151)
Maredudd ap Gruffydd, ruler (1151–1155)
The Lord Rhys, ruler (1155–1197)
Gruffydd ap Rhys II, ruler (1197–1201)
Maelgwn ap Rhys, ruler (1199–1230)

Ireland

Ireland (complete list) –
Muirchertach Ua Briain, High King (?–1119)
Domnall Ua Lochlainn, High King (?–1121)
Toirdelbach Ua Conchobair, High King (1119–1156)
Muirchertach Mac Lochlainn, High King (1156–1166)
Ruaidrí Ua Conchobair, High King (1166–1198)

Lordship of Ireland (complete list) –
John, King of England (1199–1216), Lord of Ireland (1177–1216)

Kingdom of Ailech (complete list) –
Domnall Ua Lochlainn, King (1083–1121)
Conchobar mac Domnaill, King (1121–1128)
Magnus Ua Lochlainn, King (1128–1129)
Conchobar mac Domnaill, King (1129–1136)
Muirchertach Mac Lochlainn, King (1136–1143)
Domnall Ua Gairmledaig, King (1143–1145)
Muirchertach Mac Lochlainn (again), King (1145–1166)
Conchobar mac Muirchertach Mac Lochlainn, King (1166–1167)
Niall Mac Lochlainn, King (1167–1176)
Aed In Macaem Toinlesc Ua Neill, King (1167–1177)
Mael Sechlainn mac Muirchertaig Mac Lochlainn, King (1177–1185)

Airgíalla (complete list) –
Cu Caishil Ua Cerbaill, King (?–1101)
Giolla Crist Ua hEiccnigh, King (?–1127)
Donnchadh Ua Cearbaill, King (1130–1168/1169)
Murchard Ua Cerbaill, King (1168–1189)
Muirchertach, King (1189–1194)
unknown king (?–1196)
Ua Eichnigh, King (?–1201)

Kingdom of Breifne (complete list) –
Donnchadh Ó Ruairc, Lord (1101)
Domnall Ó Ruairc, King (c.1095–1102)
Cathal Ó Ruairc, Lord (1105)
Domnall Ó Ruairc, Lord (c.1108)
Aedh an Gilla Sronmaol Ó Ruairc, King (c.1117–1122)
Tigernán mór Ó Ruairc, King (c.1124–1152, 1152–1172)
Aedh Ó Ruairc, King (1152–1152, 1172–1176)
Amlaíb Ó Ruairc, King (1176–1184)
Aedh Ó Ruairc, King (1184–1187)

Connachta (complete list) –
Domnall Ua Ruairc, King (1097–1102)
Domnall Ua Conchobair, King (1102–1106)
Tairrdelbach Ua Conchobair, King (?)
Ruaidrí Ua Conchobair, King (?)
Conchobar Ua Conchobair, King (?)
Donnell Mor Mideach Ua Conchobair, King (?)
Aedh Dall Ua Conchobair, King (?)
Máel Ísa Ua Conchobair, King (?)
Brian Breifneach Ua Conchobair, King (?)
Maghnus Ua Conchobair, King (?)
Mór Ní Conchobair, King (?)
Aed mac Ruaidrí Ua Conchobair, King (?)
Rose Ní Conchobair, King (?)
Conchobar Maenmaige Ua Conchobair, King (?)
Diarmait mac Ruaidrí Ó Conchobair, King (?)
Muirghis Cananach Ua Conchobhair, King (?)
Nuala Ní Conchobair, King (?)
Toirdhealbhach mac Ruaidhrí Ó Conchobhair, King (?)
Aedh mac Ruaidri Ó Conchobair, King (?)
Cathal Carragh Ua Conchobair, King (1190–1202)

Kingdom of Dublin (complete list) –
Magnus Barefoot, King (1102–1103)
Diarmait mac Énna meic Murchada, King (?–1117)
Domnall Gerrlámhach, King (1117–1118)
Énna Mac Murchada, King (?–1126)
Conchobar Ua Conchobair, King (1126–1127)
Conchobar Ua Briain, King (1141–1142)
Óttar, King (1142–1148)
Ragnall, King (?–1146)
Brodar mac Torcaill, King (?–1160)
Gofraid mac Amlaíb, King (?)
Ascall mac Ragnaill, King (?–1170)

Leinster (complete list) –
Donnchadh mac Murchada, King (1098–1115)
Conchobar mac Congalaig, King (1115)
Diarmait mac Énna meic Murchada, King (1115–1117)
Enna mac Donnchada meic Murchada, King (1117–1126)
Diarmait mac Murchada, King (1126–1166, 1169–1171)
Domhnall Caomhánach mac Murchada, King (1171–1175)
Domhnall Óg mac Domhnall Caomhánach, King (?)

Magh Luirg (complete list) –
Tadhg Mor mac Maelruanaidh, King (1120–1124)
Maelsechlainn mac Tadhg Mor, King (1124)
Dermot mac Tadhg Mor, King (1124–1159)
Muirgius mac Tadhg More, King (1159–1187)
Conchobar MacDermot, King (1187–1196)
Tomaltach na Cairge MacDermot, King (1196–1207)

Kingdom of Meath (complete list) –
Donnchad mac Murchada Ua Mael Sechlainn, King (1094–1105)
Conchobar mac Mael Sechlainn Ua Mael Sechlainn, King (1094–1105)
Muirchertach mac Domnaill Ua Mael Sechlainn, King (1105–1106)
Murchad mac Domnaill Ua Mael Sechlainn, King (1106–1153)
Mael Sechlainn mac Domnaill Ua Mael Sechlainn, King (1115)
Domnall mac Murchada Ua Mael Sechlainn, King (1127)
Diarmait mac Domnaill Ua Mael Sechlainn, King (1127–1130, 1155–1156, 1157–1158, 1160–1169)
Conchobar Ua Conchobair, King (1143–1144)
Donnchad mac Muirchertaig Ua Mael Sechlainn, King (1144–?)
Mael Sechlainn mac Murchada Ua Mael Sechlainn, King (1152–1155)
Donnchad mac Domnaill Ua Mael Sechlainn, King (1155, 1156–1157, 1158–1160)

Kingdom of Munster (complete list) –
Muirchertach Ua Briain, King (1086–1114, 1118–1119)

Síol Anmchadha (complete list) –
Gillafin Mac Coulahan, King (1096–1101)
Diarmaid Ua Madadhan, King (1101–1135)
Cú Coirne Ua Madudhan, King (1135–1158)
Madudan Mór Ua Madadhan, King (1158–?)
Melaghlin Ua Madadhan, King (?–1188)
Diarmaid Cleirech Ua Madadhan, King (1188–1207)

Uí Maine (complete list) –
Aed Ua Cellaigh, King (?–1134)
Diarmaid Ua Madadhan, King (?–1135)
Tadhg Ua Cellaigh, King (?–abducted 1145)
Conchobar Maenmaige Ua Cellaigh, King (?–1180)
Murrough Ua Cellaigh, King (?–1186)
Domnall Mór Ua Cellaigh, King (?–1221)

Europe: Central

Holy Roman Empire in Germany

See also List of state leaders in the 12th-century Holy Roman Empire

Holy Roman Empire, Kingdom of Germany (complete list, complete list) –
Henry IV, Holy Roman Emperor (1084–1105), King (1053–1087)
Henry V, Holy Roman Emperor (1111–1125), King (1099–1125)
Lothair II, Holy Roman Emperor (1133–1137), King (1125–1137)
Conrad III, King (1138–1152)
Henry Berengar, co-King (1138–1150)
Frederick I, Holy Roman Emperor (1155–1190), King (1152–1190)
Henry VI, Holy Roman Emperor (1191–1197), King (1190–1197)
Philip, King (1198–1208)
Otto IV, Holy Roman Emperor (1209–1215), King (1198–1209)

Hungary

Kingdom of Hungary (1000–1301) (complete list) –
Coloman, King (1095–1116)
Stephen II, King (1116–1131)
Béla II, King (1131–1141)
Géza II, King (1141–1162)
Stephen III, King (1162–1172)
Ladislaus II, usurper King (1162–1163)
Stephen IV, usurper King (1163–1165)
Béla III, King (1172–1196)
Emeric, King (1196–1204)

Poland

Kingdom of Poland (complete list) –
Władysław I Herman, Duke (1079–1102)
Zbigniew, Duke (1102–1107)
Bolesław III Wrymouth, Duke (1102–1138)

Seniorate Province in the Fragmentation of Poland (complete list) –
Władysław II the Exile, High Duke (1138–1146)
Bolesław IV the Curly, High Duke (1146–1173)
Mieszko III the Old, High Duke (1173–1177, 1191, 1198–1199, 1202)
Casimir II the Just, High Duke (1177–1191, 1191–1194)
Leszek the White, High Duke (1194–1198, 1199–1202, 1206–1210, 1211–1227)

Duchy of Opole (complete list) –
Jarosław Opolski, Duke (1173–1201)

Duchy of Masovia (complete list) –
Bolesław the Curly, Duke (1138–1173)
Leszek I, Duke (1173–1186)
Casimir II the Just, Duke (1186–1194)
Helen of Znojmo, Regent (1194–1200)
Leszek the White, Duke (1194–1200)
Konrad I, Duke (1200–1247)

State of the Teutonic Order (complete list) –
Heinrich Walpot, Grand Master (1198–pre-1208)

Europe: East

Kievan Rus' (complete list) –
Sviatopolk II of Kiev, Grand Prince (1093–1113)
Vladimir II Monomakh, Grand Prince (1113–1125)
Mstislav I the Great, Grand Prince (1125–1132)
Yaropolk II, Grand Prince (1132–1139)
Viacheslav I, Grand Prince (1139–1139)
Vsevolod II, Grand Prince (1139–1146)
Igor II, Grand Prince (1146–1146)
Iziaslav II, Grand Prince (1146–1149)
Yuri I Dolgorukiy, Grand Prince (1149–1151)
Viacheslav I, Grand Prince (1151–1154)
Iziaslav II, Grand Prince (1151–1154)
Rostislav I, Grand Prince (1154–1154)
Iziaslav III, Grand Prince (1154–1155)
Yuri I Dolgorukiy, Grand Prince (1155–1157)
Iziaslav III, Grand Prince (1157–1158)
Rostislav I, Grand Prince (1158–1167)
Mstislav II, Grand Prince (1167–1169)
Gleb, Grand Prince (1169–1169)
Mstislav II, Grand Prince (1170–1170)
Gleb, Grand Prince (1170–1171)
Vladimir III, Grand Prince (1171–1171)
Michael I, Grand Prince (1171–1171)
Roman I, Grand Prince (1171–1173)
Vsevolod III the Big Nest, Grand Prince (1173–1173)
Rurik II, Grand Prince (1173–1173)
Sviatoslav III, Grand Prince (1174–1174)
Yaroslav II, Grand Prince (1174–1175)
Roman I, Grand Prince (1175–1177)
Sviatoslav III, Grand Prince (1177–1180)
Yaroslav II, Grand Prince (1180–1180)
Rurik II, Grand Prince (1180–1182)
Sviatoslav III, Grand Prince (1182–1194)
Rurik II, Grand Prince (1194–1202)

Vladimir-Suzdal (complete list) –
Andrei I, Grand Duke (1157–1174)
Mikhail I, Grand Duke (1174, 1175–1176)
Yaropolk, Grand Duke (1174–1175)
Vsevolod the Big Nest, Grand Duke (1176–1212)

Europe: Nordic

Denmark

Denmark (complete list) – 
Eric, King (1095–1103)
Niels, King (?)
Eric II, King (?)
Eric III, King (?)
Sweyn III, King (?) / Canute V, King (?) / Valdemar I, King (?)
Canute VI, King (1182–1202)

Duchy of Schleswig (complete list) –
Valdemar II of Denmark, Duke (1183–1216)

Norway

Kingdom of Norway (872–1397) (complete list) –
Magnus III Barefoot, King (1093–1103)
Olaf Magnusson, King (1103–1115)
Eystein I, King (1103–1123)
Sigurd I the Crusader, King (1103–1130)
Harald Gille, King (1130–1136)
Magnus IV of Norway, King (1130–1135, 1137–1139)
Sigurd II, King (1136–1155)
Inge I, King (1136–1161)
Eystein II, King (1142–1157)
Magnus Haraldsson, King (1142–1145)
Haakon II, King (1157–1162)
Magnus V, King (1161–1184)
Sverre, King (1184–1202)

Sweden

Sweden (800–1521) (complete list) –
Inge the Elder, King (c.1079–c.1084, c.1087–c.1105/10)
Philip Halstensson, King (c.1105/10–1118)
Inge the Younger, King (c.1110–c.1125)
Ragnvald Knaphövde, King (1125–1126)
Magnus I, King (1120s–c.1132)
Sverker I, King (c.1132–1156)
Eric IX, King (1156–1160)
Magnus II, King (1160–1161)
Charles VII, King (1161–1167)
Kol and Boleslaw, contender Kings (1167–1173)
Canute I, King (1167–1196)
Sverker II, King (1195/96–1208)

Europe: Southcentral

See also List of state leaders in the 12th-century Holy Roman Empire#Italy

Kingdom of Italy (Holy Roman Empire) (complete list) –
Henry V, King (1098–1125)
Lothair III, King (1125–1137)
Conrad III, King (1138–1152)
Frederick I, King (1154–1186)
Henry VI, King (1186–1197)

March of Montferrat (complete list) –
Rainier, Marquis (c.1100–c.1136)
William V, Marquis (c.1136–1191)
Conrad, Marquis (1191–1192)
Boniface I, Marquis (1192–1207)

Papal States (complete list) –
Paschal II, Pope (1099–1118)
Gelasius II, Pope (1118–1119)
Callixtus II, Pope (1119–1124)
Honorius II, Pope (1124–1130)
Innocent II, Pope (1130–1143)
Celestine II, Pope (1143–1144)
Lucius II, Pope (1144–1145)
Eugene III, Pope (1145–1153)
Anastasius IV, Pope (1153–1154)
Adrian IV, Pope (1154–1159)
Alexander III, Pope (1159–1181)
Lucius III, Pope (1181–1185)
Urban III, Pope (1185–1187)
Gregory VIII, Pope (1187)
Clement III, Pope (1187–1191)
Celestine III, Pope (1191–1198)
Innocent III, Pope (1198–1216)

Duchy of Spoleto (complete list) –
Werner II, Duke (1093–1119)
Engelbert III of Sponheim, Duke (1135–1137)
Henry the Proud, Duke (1137–1139)
Ulrich of Attems, imperial vicar (1139–1152)
Welf VI, Duke (1152–1160)
Welf VII, Duke (1160–1167)
Welf VI, Duke (1167–1173)
Ridelulf, Duke (1173–1183)
Conrad I, Duke (1183–1190, 1195–1198)
Pandulf II, Duke (1190–1195), vassal Duke (1198–1205)

March of Tuscany (complete list) –
Matilda, Margravine (1076–1115)
Rabodo, Margrave (1116–1119)
Conrad, Margrave (1119/20–1129/31)
Rampret, Margrave (c.1131)
Engelbert, Margrave (1134/35–1137)
Henry the Proud, Margrave (1137–1139)
Ulrich of Attems, imperial vicar (1139–1152)
Welf VI, Margrave (1152–1160)
Welf VII, Margrave (1160–1167)
Rainald of Dassel, imperial vicar (1160–1163)
Christian of Buch, imperial vicar (1163–1173)
Welf VI, Margrave (1167–1173)
Philip, Margrave (1195–1197)

Republic of Venice (complete list) –
Vitale I Michiel, Doge (1096–1102)
Ordelafo Faliero, Doge (1102–1117)
Domenico Michele, Doge (1117–1130)
Pietro Polani, Doge (1130–1148)
Domenico Morosini, Doge (1148–1156)
Vital II Michele, Doge (1156–1172)
Sebastiano Ziani, Doge (1172–1178)
Orio Mastropiero, Doge (1178–1192)
Enrico Dandolo, Doge (1192–1205)

Southern Italy 

Southern Italy

County/ Duchy of Apulia and Calabria (complete list) –
Roger I Borsa, Duke (1085–1111)
William II, Duke (1111–1127)

Duchy of Gaeta (complete list) – 
Landulf, Duke (1091–1103)
William II, Duke (1103–1104/1105)
Richard II, Duke (1104/1105–1111)
Andrew, Duke (1111–1112)
Jonathan, Duke (1112–1121)
Richard III, Duke (1121–1140)

Duchy of Naples (complete list) – 
Sergius VI, Duke (1077–1107)
John VI, Duke (1090–1122)
Sergius VII, Duke (1122–1137)
Alfonso, Duke (1139–1144)
William, Duke (1144–1154)

County of Sicily (complete list) –
Roger I, Count (1071–1101)
Simon, Count (1101–1105)
Roger II, Count (1105–1130), King (1130–1154)

Kingdom of Sicily (complete list) –
Roger II, Count (1105–1130), King (1130–1154)
William I, King (1154–1166)
William II, King (1166–1189)
Tancred, King (1189–1194)
Roger III, King (1192–1193)
William III, King (1194)
Constance, Queen (1194–1198)
Henry I, King (1194–1197)
Frederick I, King (1198–1250)

Principality of Taranto (complete list) –
Bohemond I, Count (1085–1088), Prince (1088–1111)
Bohemond II, Prince (1111–1128)
Roger II, Prince (1128–1132)
Tancred, Prince (1132–1138)
William I, Prince (1138–1144)
Simon, Prince (1144–1157)
William II, Prince (1157–1189)
Tancred of Sicily, Prince (1189–1194)
William III, Prince (1194)
Henry, Prince (1194–1198)
Robert, Prince (1198–1200)
Walter III of Brienne, Prince (1200–1205)

Europe: Southwest

Iberian Peninsula: Christian

Kingdom / Crown of Aragon (complete list) –
Peter I, King (1094–1104)
Alfonso I the Battler, King (1104–1134)
Ramiro II the Monk, King (1134–1137)
Petronilla, Queen (1137–1164)
Alfonso II, King (1164–1196)
Peter II, King (1196–1213)

Kingdom of Castile (complete list) –
Alfonso VI the Brave, King (1072–1109)
Urraca the Reckless, King (1109–1126)
Alfonso VII the Emperor, King (1126–1157)
Sancho III the Desired, King (1157–1158)
Alfonso VIII the Noble, King (1158–1214)

County of Barcelona (complete list) –
Ramon Berenguer III, Count (1082–1131)
Ramon Berenguer IV, Count (1131–1162)
Alphonse I, Count (1164–1196)
Peter II, Count (1196–1213)

Kingdom of Navarre (complete list) –
Peter I, King (1094–1104)
Alfonso I, King (1104–1134)
García Ramírez IV, King (1134–1150)
Sancho VI, King (1150–1194)
Sancho VII, King (1194–1234)

Kingdom of Portugal (complete list) –
Afonso I, King (1139–1185)
Sancho I, King (1185–1212)

Marca Hispanica

County of Osona (complete list) –
Jimena, Count (1107–1149)
Bernard, Count (1107–1111)

County of Cerdanya (complete list) –
William II, Count (1095–1109)
Bernard, Count (1109–1118)
Raymond Berengar I, Count (1118–1131)
Raymond Berengar II, Count (1131–1162)
Peter, Count (1162–1168)
Sancho I, Count (1168–1223)

County of Urgell (complete list) –
Ermengol V of Mollerussa, Count (1092–1102)
Ermengol VI of Castile, Count (1102–1153/1154)
Ermengol VII of Valencia, Count (1153/1154–1184)
Ermengol VIII of Sant Hilari, Count (1184–1208/1209)

Europe: West

France

Kingdom of France (complete list) –
Philip I the Amorous, King (1060–1108)
Louis VI the Fat, King (1108–1137)
Louis VII the Young, King (1137–1180)
Philip II Augustus, King (1180–1223)

County of Angoulême (complete list) –
William V (Taillefer III), Count (1087–1120)
Wulgrin II, Count (1120–1140)
William VI (Taillefer IV), Count (1140–1179)
Wulgrin III, Count (1179–1181)
William VII (Taillefer V), Count (1181–1186)
Aymer III, Count (1186–1202)

Anjou (complete list) –
Geoffrey IV, Count (1103–1106)
Geoffrey V, Count (1129–1151)
Henry, Count (1151–1189)
Richard, Count (1189–1199)

Duchy of Aquitaine (complete list) –
William IX, Duke (1086–1127)
William X, Duke (1127–1137)
Eleanor of Aquitaine, Duke (1137–1204)
Louis the Younger, Duke (1137–1152)
Henry I, Duke (1152–1189)
Richard I Lionheart, Duke (1189–1199)
John I, Duke (1199–1216)

County of Artois (complete list) –
Isabella, Countess (1180–1190)
Louis VIII of France, Count (1190–1223)

Auvergne (complete list) –
William VI, Count (1096–1136)
Robert III, Count (1136–1143)
William VII the Young, Count (1143–c.1155)
William VIII the Old, Count (1155–1182)
Robert IV, Count (1182–1194)
William IX, Count (1194–1195)
Guy II, Count (1195–1224)

County of Boulogne (complete list) –
Eustace III, ruler (1087–1125)
Matilda I, Countess (1125–1151)
Eustace IV, Count (1151–1153)
William I, Count (1153–1159)
Mary I, Countess (1159–1170)
Matthew, Count (1170–1173)
Matthew II, Count (1173–1180)
Gerard, Count (1181–1182)
Berthold, Count (1183–1186)
Ida, Countess (1173–1216)

Bourbonnais (complete list) –
, Lord (1116–1120)
, Lord (1120–1171)
, Lady (1171–1218)

Duchy of Brittany (complete list) –
Alan IV, Duke (1072–1112)
Conan III, Duke (1112–1148)
Bertha, Duchess (1148–1156)
Odo II, Duke (1148–1156)
Conan IV, Duke (1156–1166)
Constance, Duchess (1166–1201)
Geoffrey II, Duke (1181–1186),
Guy of Thouars, Duke (1199–1201)
Arthur I, Duke (1196–1203)

Duchy of Burgundy (complete list) –
Odo I, Duke (1079–1103)
Hugh II, Duke (1103–1143)
Odo II, Duke (1143–1162)
Hugh III, Duke (1162–1192)
Odo III, Duke (1192–1218)

County of Champagne (complete list) –
Hugh, Count (1102–1125)
Theobald II, Count (1125–1152)
Henry I, Count (1152–1181)
Henry II, Count (1181–1197)
Theobald III, Count (1197–1201)

County of Flanders (complete list) –
Robert II, Count (1093–1111)
Baldwin VII Hapkin, Count (1111–1119)
Charles I the Good, Count (1119–1127)
William I Clito, Count (1127–1128)
Theodoric, Count (1128–1168)
Philip I, Count (1168–1191)
Margaret I, Countess (1191–1194)
Baldwin VIII, Count (1191–1194)
Baldwin IX, Count (1194–1205)

Duchy of Gascony (complete list) –
William IX, Duke (1086–1126)
William X, Duke (1126–1137)
Eleanor of Aquitaine, Duchess (1137–1204)

County of Maine (complete list) –
Elias I, Count (1093–1110)
Eremburga and Fulk V of Anjou, Countess and Count (1110–1126)
Geoffrey of Anjou, Count (1126–1151)
Elias II, Count (1151)
Henry II of England, Count (1151–1189)
Henry the Young King, Count (1169–1183)
Richard the Lionheart, Count (1189–1199)
Arthur I of Brittany, Count (1186–1203)

County of Nevers (complete list) –
William II, Count (1097–1148)
William III, Count (1148–1161)
William IV, Count (1161–1168)
Guy, Count (1168–1175)
William V, Count (1175–1181)
Agnes I, Countess (1181–1192)
Peter II of Courtenay, Count (1184–1192)
Matilda I, Countess (1192–1257)
Hervé IV of Donzy, Count (1199–1223)

County of Poitou (complete list) –
William VII, Count (1071–1126)
William VIII, Count (1099–1137)
Eleanor, Countess (1137–1189)
Louis VII of France, Count (1137–1152)
Henry II of England, Count (1152, 1156–1189)
William IX, Count (1153–1156)
Richard I, Count (1169–1196)
Otto, Count (1196–1198)
Richard I, Count (1198–1199)

Provence / Lower Burgundy (complete list) –
Gerberga, Countess (1093–1112)
Douce I, Countess (1112–1127)

County of Toulouse (complete list) –
Raymond IV (VI) of St Gilles, Count (1094–1105)
Philippa & William IX, Countess & Count (1098–1101, 1109–1117)
Bertrand of Tripoli, Count (1105–1109)
William IX of Aquitaine, Count (1117–1120)
Alfonso Jordan, Count (1109–1148)
Raymond V (VII), Count (1148–1194)
Raymond VI (VIII), Count (1194–1222)

County of Vermandois (complete list) –
Adelaide, Countess (1085–1101)

Eurasia: Caucasus

Kingdom of Georgia (complete list) –
David IV, King (1089–1125)
Demetrius I, King (1125–1154, 1155–1156)
David V, King (1154–1155)
George III, King (1156–1184)
Tamar the Great, Queen (1178–1213)

First Kingdom of Kakheti (complete list) –
Kvirike IV, King (1084–1102)
Aghsartan II, King (1102–1105)

Oceania

Chile: Easter Island

Easter Island (complete list) –
Te Ria Kautahito (Hirakau-Tehito?), King (?)
Ko Te Pu I Te Toki, King (?)
Kuratahogo, King (?)
Ko Te Hiti Rua Nea, King (?)
Te Uruaki Kena, King (?)
Tu Te Rei Manana, King (c.1200)

Tonga

Tuʻi Tonga Empire (complete list) –
ʻApuanea, King (?)
ʻAfulunga, King (?)
Momo, King (c.1100)
Tuʻitātui, King (c.1100)
Talatama, King (?)
Tuʻitonganui ko e Tamatou, King (?)

United States: Hawaii

Island of Hawaiʻi (complete list) –
Kapawa, supreme high chief (?)
Pilikaʻaeia, supreme high chief (1125–1155)
Kukohou, supreme high chief (1155–1185)
Kaniuhu, supreme high chief (1185–1215)

See also

References 

12th century
 
-